This is a list of universities in Saint Vincent and the Grenadines.

Universities 
 American University of St. Vincent
 Richmond Gabriel University
Saint James School of Medicine
Saint Teresa University
 St. Vincent and the Grenadines Community College
 Trinity Medical Sciences University
 University College of The Caribbean - Saint Vincent Campus
 University of the West Indies, Open Campus

See also 
 List of universities by country

References

Universities
Saint Vincent and the Grenadines
Saint Vincent and the Grenadines

Universities